Tetrapteron graciliflorum is a species of evening primrose known by the common name hill suncup. It is native to Oregon and California, where it grows in several habitat types, often on clay soils. It is an annual herb generally with no stem but producing an upright, nodding inflorescence. There is a cluster of narrow leaves each one to ten centimeters long. The flowers have bright yellow petals one half to two centimeters long. The fruit is a leathery capsule less than a centimeter in length with four chambers containing bumpy brown seeds.

References

External links
Jepson Manual Treatment
Photo gallery

Onagraceae
Flora of California
Flora of Oregon
Flora without expected TNC conservation status